Khanegah on the Alinjachay River – is a tomb dated to between the 13th and 15th centuries and is located in the Khanegah village of Julfa District, Azerbaijan. The tomb is on the Alinjachay River.

Architecture
Khanegah was built of burned brick of 20 x 20 x 5 metre size. Pendentive of the building is built like muqarnas. The complex consists of two mausoleums: one of them is attach to other in the 15th century.

Gallery
In 2008, a postage stamp of Azerbaijan with the picture of the khanegah was released.

References

Mausoleums in Azerbaijan
Tourist attractions in Azerbaijan